Custard Records is an American record label, best known for its success with English singer-songwriter James Blunt. The label is run by former 4 Non Blondes member Linda Perry and has a partnership with Warner Music Group's Atlantic Records division.

Roster
 Linda Perry
 James Blunt
 Deep Dark Robot
 Ben Jelen
 Bigelf
 Crash Kings
 Hemming
 Little Fish
 Paper Zoo
 Reni Lane
 Sierra Swan
 Sunshine

Discography

Albums 
James Blunt – Back to Bedlam (2004)
Linda Perry – In Flight (2005)
Sunshine – Moonshower and Razorblades (2005)
Sierra Swan – LadyLand (2006)
Ben Jelen – Ex-Sensitive (2007)
James Blunt – All the Lost Souls (2007)
Bigelf – Hex (2007)
Ben Jelen – Wreckage EP (2008)
Bigelf – Cheat The Gallows (2008)
Crash Kings – Crash Kings (2009)
Little Fish – Darling Dear EP (2009) 
Reni Lane – Reni Lane (2010)
Little Fish – Baffled and Beat (2010)
James Blunt – Some Kind of Trouble (2010)
Deep Dark Robot – 8 Songs About A Girl (2011)
James Blunt – Moon Landing (2013)
Hemming – Hemming (2015)

See also
 List of record labels

References

External links
 Official Website

American record labels
Pop record labels